The 2012 FIRS Women's Roller Hockey World Cup or Recife 2012 was the 11th edition of the women's roller hockey world cup. It was held in Recife, Brazil from November 10 to November 17, 2012 and it was contested by fourteen teams, two less than the previous edition. France defeated 4-times champion Spain in the final to win the World Cup for the first time.

Group stage

Group A

Group B

Group C

Group D

Play-off stages

9th to 14th placing

Final ranking

Top scorers
12 goals
  Natasha Lee
  Stephanie Moor

10 goals
  Tatiana Malard

9 goals
  María Díez
  Francisca Donoso

7 goals
  Maren Wichardt

6 goals
  Catalina Acevedo
  Andrea Rodríguez
  Laura La Rocca
  Tanja Kammermann

5 goals
  Yolanda Font
  Rute Lopes
  Marlene Sousa
  Yanina Defilche
  Erin House
  Autumn Lee
  Kirsty Ingham
  Yasndeep Kaur

4 goals
  Anna Casarramona
  Macarena Ramos
  Fernanda Urrea
  Luciana Giunta
  Erica Bueno
  Mariana Cabral
  Daniela Senn
  Kimberley Hughes
  Kaori Ito
  Ana Noelia Trinidate
  Mandeep Kaur

See also
FIRS Women's Roller Hockey World Cup

References

External links
Official website
CIRH website

Women's Roller Hockey World Cup
International roller hockey competitions hosted by Brazil
2012 FIRS Women's World Cup
Roller Hockey World Championship
World